Juventus F.C. finished the season as Serie A champions. They also participated in the Coppa Italia and the European Cup.

Squad

Competitions

Serie A

League table

Matches

Coppa Italia 

First round

European Cup

First round

Second round

References

Juventus F.C. seasons
Juventus
Italian football championship-winning seasons